Tenshi may refer to:

 , a spiritual being in Japanese Buddhism
 , a title adopted by the Emperor of Japan in the 7th century
 , a 2006 Japanese film based on a manga series by Erica Sakurazawa
 Tenshi, or Kanade Tachibana, a fictional character in the anime television series Angel Beats!
 Tenshi Hinanai, a fictional character in the video game series Touhou Project

See also
 
 
 Tianzi (disambiguation)